Souani is a town and commune in Tlemcen Province in north-western Algeria.

References

Communes of Tlemcen Province
Cities in Algeria
Algeria